People's store may refer to:
 Peoples (store), a defunct chain of department stores based in Tacoma, Washington
 A. Hamburger & Sons, store originally known as "The People’s Store"
 Gately's People's Store, a department store in Chicago